Anatrachyntis is a genus of moths in the family Cosmopterigidae. Some authors include it in Pyroderces.

Species
Anatrachyntis acris (Meyrick, 1911) (the Seychelles)
Anatrachyntis aellotricha (Meyrick, 1889) (New Zealand) (often in Pyroderces)
Anatrachyntis amphisaris (Meyrick, 1922) (Sri Lanka)
Anatrachyntis anaclastis (Meyrick, 1897) (Australia, Queensland)
Anatrachyntis anoista (Bradley, 1956) (Lord Howe Island)

Anatrachyntis badia – Florida pink scavenger
Anatrachyntis bicincta (Ghesquière, 1940) (Zaire)
Anatrachyntis biorrhizae Sinev, 1986 (Russia, Primorje)
Anatrachyntis calefacta (Meyrick, 1922) (India)
Anatrachyntis carpophila (Ghesquière, 1940) (Zaire)
Anatrachyntis cecidicida (Ghesquière, 1940) (Zaire)
Anatrachyntis centropecta (Meyrick, 1931) (Peninsular Malaysia)
Anatrachyntis centrophanes (Meyrick, 1915) (India)
Anatrachyntis coriacella (Snellen, 1901) (Indonesia, Java)
Anatrachyntis coridophaga (Meyrick, 1925) (North Africa, Egypt)
Anatrachyntis cyma (Bradley, 1953) (Fiji)
 Anatrachyntis dactyliota (Meyrick, 1931) (Peninsular Malaysia)

Anatrachyntis euryspora (Meyrick, 1922) (Fiji)
Anatrachyntis exagria (Meyrick, 1915) (India)
Anatrachyntis falcatella (Stainton, 1859) (India)

Anatrachyntis floretella (Legrand, 1958) (Seychelles)
Anatrachyntis gerberanella (Legrand, 1965) (Seychelles)

Anatrachyntis gymnocentra (Meyrick, 1937) (Zaire)
Anatrachyntis haemodryas (Meyrick, 1930) (Peninsular Malaysia)
Anatrachyntis hemipelta Meyrick, 1917 (India)

Anatrachyntis hieroglypta (Meyrick, 1911) (Seychelles)
Anatrachyntis holotherma (Meyrick, 1936) (Zaire)
Anatrachyntis incertulella – pandanus flower moth
Anatrachyntis japonica Kuroko, 1982 (Japan)
Anatrachyntis lunulifera  (Meyrick, 1934) (Marquesas)
Anatrachyntis megacentra (Meyrick, 1923) (Fiji)
Anatrachyntis melanostigma  (Diakonoff, 1954) (New Guinea)
Anatrachyntis mesoptila  (Meyrick, 1897) (Australia, Queensland)
Anatrachyntis mythologica Meyrick, 1917 (Sri Lanka)
Anatrachyntis nephelopyrrha Meyrick, 1917 (India)
Anatrachyntis orphnographa  (Meyrick, 1936) (Zaire)
Anatrachyntis oxyptila (Meyrick, 1928) (New Ireland)
Anatrachyntis palmicola (Ghesquière, 1940) (Zaire)
Anatrachyntis paroditis (Meyrick, 1928) (Fiji)
Anatrachyntis philocarpa (Meyrick, 1922) (Iraq)
Anatrachyntis philogeorga (Meyrick, 1933) (Tanzania)
Anatrachyntis ptilodelta (Meyrick, 1922) (China, Shanghai)

Anatrachyntis pyrrhodes (Meyrick, 1897) (Australia)

Anatrachyntis rhizonympha (Meyrick, 1924) (India)
Anatrachyntis rileyi – pink cornworm, pink bud moth, pink scavenger
Anatrachyntis risbeci (Ghesquière, 1940) (Senegal)
Anatrachyntis sesamivora (Meyrick, 1933) (Indonesia, Java)

 Anatrachyntis simplex (Walsingham, 1891) (Africa, Gambia)

Anatrachyntis strangalota (Meyrick, 1922) (southern India)

 Anatrachyntis tentoria (Meyrick, 1911) (Seychelles)
 Anatrachyntis terminella (Walker, 1864) (Australia, New South Wales)

Anatrachyntis tripola (Meyrick, 1909) (South Africa, Transvaal)
Anatrachyntis vanharteni Koster, 2010

Anatrachyntis yunnanea (Zagulajev, 1959) (China, Yunnan)

References
Natural History Museum Lepidoptera genus database
Anatrachyntis at Fauna Europaea
Anatrachyntis at Afro Moths

 
Cosmopteriginae
Moth genera